Face the Truth may refer to:

 Face the Truth (Stephen Malkmus album)
 Face the Truth (John Norum album)
 Face the Truth, a syndicated panel show hosted by Vivica A. Fox aired from September 2018 to May 2019